Svetlana Osipova (born 3 May 2000) is an Uzbekistani taekwondo practitioner. She won the gold medal in the women's heavyweight event at the 2022 World Taekwondo Championships held in Guadalajara, Mexico. She also won the gold medal in the women's +73kg event at the 2021 Islamic Solidarity Games held in Konya, Turkey. In 2019, she won the gold medal in the women's +73kg event at the Military World Games held in Wuhan, China.

In 2018, she won one of the bronze medals in the women's +67kg event at the Asian Games held in Jakarta, Indonesia.

She won the silver medal in the women's −73kg event at the 2017 Asian Indoor and Martial Arts Games held in Ashgabat, Turkmenistan.

In 2021, she competed in the women's +67kg event at the 2020 Summer Olympics in Tokyo, Japan. She was eliminated in her first match by Cansel Deniz of Kazakhstan.

References

External links 
 

Living people
2000 births
Sportspeople from Tashkent
Uzbekistani female taekwondo practitioners
Taekwondo practitioners at the 2018 Asian Games
Medalists at the 2018 Asian Games
Asian Games bronze medalists for Uzbekistan
Asian Games medalists in taekwondo
Taekwondo practitioners at the 2020 Summer Olympics
Olympic taekwondo practitioners of Uzbekistan
Islamic Solidarity Games medalists in taekwondo
Islamic Solidarity Games competitors for Uzbekistan
World Taekwondo Championships medalists
21st-century Uzbekistani women